"We Used To" is a song written and recorded by American country music artist Dolly Parton. It was released in September 1975 as the second from the album Dolly. The song reached #9 on the U.S. country singles charts. The song featured a guitar pattern at the opening which put a number of critics and fans in mind of the Led Zeppelin classic "Stairway to Heaven". (Parton, who has stated a number of times that she is a longtime Led Zeppelin fan, eventually covered "Stairway" in 2002.)

Chart performance

References

External links

We Used To lyrics at Dolly Parton On-Line

1975 singles
1975 songs
Dolly Parton songs
Songs written by Dolly Parton
Song recordings produced by Bob Ferguson (musician)
RCA Records singles